Eugene Charle Sykes (born September 26, 1941) is a former American football defensive back.  Sykes scored a touchdown in LSU's 25–7 defeat of Colorado in the 1962 Orange Bowl.  In 1963, he appeared with the LSU team in the Cotton Bowl, where they defeated Texas 13–0, and in the Hula Bowl All-Star Game.

As a professional, Sykes was drafted by the American Football League's Buffalo Bills, playing for them in 1963 and for their AFL Championship teams of 1964 and 1965.  He finished his Professional Football career with the AFL's Denver Broncos in 1966.

See also
List of American Football League players

1941 births
Living people
American football defensive backs
Buffalo Bills players
Denver Broncos (AFL) players
LSU Tigers football players
Players of American football from New Orleans
American Football League players